Thekkan Kuttur or  Tekkan Kuttur is a place in Malappuram district of Kerala in India. Its under Tirur block and Thalakkad village.

Demographics
Around 4000 people are living here. There is a Shiva Temple named "Pazhayeadath-Sivakshethram" another small temple is also there which named as "Puthiyeadath-Kshethram".

Education
There are two schools named A.M.L.P.S and G.L.P.S. Most of the peoples of this village depends on farming.
Thekkan Kuttur is extended to Kuttur Desom which is unofficially known as Vadakkan Kuttur.
Thekkan Kuttur Post office is located in Kuttur Desom. There is another school Devi Sahayam Lower Primary School in Kuttur.

Economy
This village is predominantly occupied by people working in Gulf Countries. This place may be one of the highest paid in terms 
of Labour charges. A paradise for labours. Still Most of the people are reluctant to do labour and wait for getting some job
in Gulf countries.

Temples
There are three more temples in Kuttur. A very ancient Parthasarathy Temple which were maintained by Namboodiris during last century.
Anthimahakalan Temple which is family temple of Amassam Veetil, an ancient Nair Tharavad located at Kuttur. An ancient Bhagavathy temple known to be maintained directly by kings of Vettathu nadu also exists between Kuttur and Pothanur (nearby village). This bagavathy temple is having many surprising and interesting traditions. Still Oracles (Velichappadu)  profess during specific festivals.

Festivals
Daily pujas are done by Mannan community (OBC). All sects of Hindu fraternity participate in rituals wholeheartedly at this temple.
It is said that Muslims also participate and co-operate in all the festivals.

History
After 1928 Moppila riots all Nambudiri families residing in Kuttur Desom migrated to Palakkad. 
People are slowly migrating to nearby cities since agriculture is not profitable. Economy is purely depending on the Gulf money.

Transportation
Thekkankuttoor village connects to other parts of India through Tirur town.  National highway No.66 passes through Tirur and the northern stretch connects to Goa and Mumbai.  The southern stretch connects to Cochin and Trivandrum.   Highway No.966 goes to Palakkad and Coimbatore.   The nearest airport is at Kozhikode.  The nearest major railway station is at Tirur.

References

   Villages in Malappuram district
Tirur area